Sehnde is a town in Lower Saxony, Germany. It is located approximately 15 kilometres southeast of Hanover.

History
Sehnde was formed in 1974 by combining fifteen autonomous villages which belonged to three different districts: Bilm, Bolzum, Dolgen, Evern, Gretenberg, Haimar, Höver, Ilten, Klein Lobke, Müllingen, Rethmar, Sehnde, Wassel, Wehmingen, and Wirringen. Sehnde received its town charter in 1997.

The whole area was agricultural for centuries, until large salt and potash deposits were  discovered at the end of the 19th century. Several potash mines were dug, the first at Gustavshall in Hohenfels in 1896. During the 20th century, Sehnde and Ilten were the chief beneficiaries of the mines, until the last one was closed in 1995. Since the 1950s, most of the area has been transformed into dormitory villages, while jobs have concentrated in Hannover. In 2005, small one-family houses dominate large parts of Sehnde and its villages.

Culture
The former potash mine Hohenfels in Wehmingen houses the national German tramway museum, the Hannoversches Straßenbahn-Museum.

References

External links

  

Hanover Region